Caudete de las Fuentes is a municipality in the comarca of Requena-Utiel in the Valencian Community, Spain.

References

Municipalities in the Province of Valencia
Requena-Utiel